Milton B. Hine (February 2, 1828September 1, 1881) was a Michigan politician.

Early life and education
Milton B. Hine was born on February 2, 1828, in Meredith, New York. His parents, Demas and Sally Hine, were both from Connecticut and of English descent. Demas Hine was a physician. In New York state, Milton received a public school education, and was later educated at the Delaware Literary Institute. In the autumn of 1847, Milton moved to a farm in Cannon Township in Kent County, Michigan.

Career
In 1871, Hine became the president and treasurer of the Farmers' Mutual Fire Insurance Company of Kent County. He would hold these positions in the insurance company for the rest of his life. In political affiliation, Hine was a life-long Democrat until the formation of the Greenback Party in 1874. On August 7, 1878, in Grand Rapids, Hine was nominated by the Kent County Greenback Convention for the Michigan Senate seat representing the 25th district. The nomination was backed by the Kent County Democratic Committee. On November 5, 1878, Hine defeated incumbent Republican Wesley P. Andrus. He served in the state senate from January 1, 1879, to January 1, 1881. In 1880, Hine put one of his son-in-laws in charge of his farmlands, so he could retire in Lowell, Michigan. He then started a shoe and boot dealing firm by the name of Hawk & Hine.

Personal life
In 1850, Hine married Polly Ann Hartwell. Together, they had two daughters. Hine was a Freemason.

Death
Hine died on September 1, 1881, of typhoid fever in Lowell, after four weeks of suffering with the illness. He was interred at Oakwood Cemetery in Lowell.

References

1828 births
1881 deaths
American businesspeople in insurance
American Freemasons
American people of English descent
American treasurers
Burials in Michigan
Deaths from typhoid fever
Farmers from Michigan
Michigan Democrats
Michigan Greenbacks
Michigan state senators
People from Delaware County, New York
People from Lowell, Michigan
19th-century American businesspeople
19th-century American politicians